is a monorail station on the Osaka Monorail located in Ibaraki, Osaka, Japan.

The name means the "station in front of Osaka University Hospital."

Lines
Osaka Monorail Saito Line (Station Number: 52)

Layout
There is an island platform with two tracks.

Adjacent stations

External links 
 Timetable of the monorail

Ibaraki, Osaka
Osaka Monorail stations
Osaka University transportation
Railway stations in Japan opened in 1998